Aydinlar (also, Aydynlar) is a village in the Shabran District of Azerbaijan.

References 

Populated places in Shabran District